Keith Brooks (8 April 1917 – 23 December 1981) was  a former Australian rules footballer who played with Richmond in the Victorian Football League (VFL).

Notes

External links 
		

1917 births
1981 deaths
Australian rules footballers from Victoria (Australia)
Richmond Football Club players
Brighton Football Club players